Leviathan is a comic strip by Peter Blegvad, an American musician, singer-songwriter, and cartoonist. It appeared in the review section of the British newspaper The Independent on Sunday during the 1990s.

Plot
The title character, whose name is shortened in the strip to Levi, is drawn as a faceless baby who constantly carries a stuffed toy rabbit called either Bunny or Rabbit.  A pet cat called Cat is often around to give advice.  The strip describes Levi's experiences as he crawls around a surreal and often frightening landscape filled with disjointed words and objects, which perhaps reflect the incomprehensible nature of the world as seen by a baby, but which also raise philosophical questions of interest to adults.

Collected editions 
The Book of Leviathan, Peter Blegvad, Overlook Press,

External links
Official Leviathan web site

British comic strips
Comic strips started in the 1990s
Gag-a-day comics
Child characters in comics